Casino Raiders is a 1989 Hong Kong action drama film written and directed by Jimmy Heung and Wong Jing and starring Andy Lau, Alan Tam, Idy Chan and Rosamund Kwan. It belonged to the early part of the 1989-1996 period, a period when gambling-themed films were dominating the Hong Kong movie scene. It was released one week after Fatal Bet, another film by Heung based on the same true story but filmed in English with different actors in the lead roles. The film was followed by two sequels, No Risk, No Gain (1990) and Casino Raiders II (1991), which have unrelated plots.

Plot
Crab Chan (Andy Lau) and Sam Law (Alan Tam) are a pair of renowned professional gamblers who are best friends. One day, a tycoon named Lung (Charles Heung) summons the two of them to his casino in Lake Tahoe to crack a scam led by a pair of Japanese gamblers, Kung (Hagiwara Kenzo) and his son Taro (Lung Fong). There, Crab and Sam also meet Koyan Tong (Idy Chan), a rich heiress from Hong Kong who is on vacation in the United States. Koyan and Sam also develop a relationship.

After the three of them return to Hong Kong, Sam is being hunted down by triads who were sent by Kung to seek revenge. Fortunately, Sam is rescued by Crab. However, this leads to Crab severely injuring his left hand, which affects his gambling skills.

Koyan introduces her father to Sam, who is arranged to work in his future father-in-law's company. There, Sam also ruins the Kungs' plan to scheme money from Mr Tong, and Kung therefore hires more killers to kill Sam, and this time, he becomes injured and hospitalised. Mr Tong demands him to give up gambling which Sam promised to do. At Sam and Koyan's engagement, Crab brings his girlfriend Bo Bo (Rosamund Kwan) to congratulate the two while also finding out that Sam had decided to go straight. Sam wanted Crab to come help him in the company or lend money to start some decent business.  Crab rejects these offers, citing that his English is not as good as Sam's, while in actuality, Crab did not want to give up gambling.

One day, Crab goes to a casino and sees Taro, since the casino was owned by him. Taro wanted to gamble with Crab with a bet of HK$3 million, but the police unexpectedly break in. Although they are not prosecuted because Taro's stake was thrown outside, it is revealed that most of Crab's stakes were counterfeit bills and Taro feels offended. Taro retaliates by kidnapping Koyan and challenges Crab to retrieve her. At this time, Sam is doing business with his father in-law in Australia, so Crab temporarily abandons his plan to immigrate to Brazil with Bo Bo and goes to confront Taro. Not only does Taro insult and rape Koyan, he also shoots and kills Bo Bo, who came to back up Crab before a fight between Crab and Taro's henchmen ensued. In order to rescue Koyan, Crab is forced to pick between two glasses of wine, one of which contains poison. Kung is convinced that Crab has made the right choice and lets them leave, but Crab succumbs to the poison after he and Koyan escape.

After Sam returns to Hong Kong, he is determined to seek vengeance for Crab. Sam seeks help from Lung and other American casino owners. The Americans also use this as a chance to compete with the Japanese for the interests of casinos in Asia, which created heavy gang warfare. They eventually agree to hold a poker game with Taro representing Japan and Sam representing America. Koyan also brings over HK$1 billion of asset certificates to support Sam.

During the intermission of the final round of the poker game, Sam is attacked by a hitman in the restroom. The injured Sam entrusts Koyan to take his place for the final bet. He tells her to bet his entire stake, and since Taro would not have a sufficient stake, he also bets his arm and leg to even it out. Koyan requests this at the gambling table and Taro agrees to it, but Koyan has to bet her hand as well to make the bet fair. During the game, Koyan's hand shows the ten of hearts, the jack of hearts, the king of hearts and the ace of hearts, while Taro's hand shows two queens and two jacks. In the end, Koyan wins with a straight flush. Taro does not want to cut off his arm and leg, so he shoots and kills his father and other audience members before being shot dead by both the Americans and Japanese.

Koyan then goes to see Sam at the hospital where she overhears a conversation between Sam and the hitman who shot him. It is revealed that the attack in the bathroom was staged by Sam himself in order to have Taro agree to bet his arm and leg and ultimately have the Kungs kill each other, achieving his ultimate goal of seeking vengeance for Crab. Sam also says he does not intend to let Koyan know about this secret and instead, he would conceal it forever. After hearing this, Koyan removes her engagement ring, leaves it on the floor outside Sam's room and leaves.

Cast
 Andy Lau as Crab Chan
 Alan Tam as Sam Law
 Idy Chan as Koyan Tong
 Rosamund Kwan as Bo Bo
 Charles Heung as Lung
 Eddy Ko as Gold Teeth
 Robin Shou as Sam's hired hitman
 Kirk Wong as San
 Lung Fong as Taro
 Gregory Charles Rivers as Bellboy
 Hagiwara Kenzo as Mr Kung
 Shum Wai as Uncle Shi
 Ronald Wong as Informer
 Bruce Fontaine as Sam's hired stuntman
 Mike Abbott as Sam's hired stuntman
 Roger Thomas as Mr Fransolini's thug

See also
 Andy Lau filmography
 List of Hong Kong films

References

External links
 
 

1989 films
Hong Kong action drama films
Hong Kong martial arts films
1980s action drama films
1989 martial arts films
1980s Cantonese-language films
Films about gambling
Golden Harvest films
Films set in California
Films shot in California
Films set in Hong Kong
Films set in West Germany
Films set in Tokyo
Films shot in Hong Kong
Films shot in Singapore
1989 crime drama films
1980s Hong Kong films